Beatrice Annika Miller (born February 7, 1999) is an American singer and actress. She came in ninth place on season two of The X Factor (US) when she was 13 years old. She was later signed to Hollywood Records. Her debut EP Young Blood was released in 2014, and her debut album Not an Apology was released on July 24, 2015. In 2016, she released the single "Yes Girl". During 2017, she released the EPs Chapter One: Blue, Chapter Two: Red, and Chapter Three: Yellow. The three EPs, along with five additional songs, were collected as her second studio album, Aurora.

In 2018, she featured as the lead vocalist on NOTD's single "I Wanna Know", which reached the top 20 in Australia, Belgium and Norway. In 2019, she released the singles "It's Not U It's Me" with 6lack, "Feel Something", "Feels Like Home" with Jessie Reyez and "Never Gonna Like You" with Snakehips. She signed with Olliebear Records and Create Music Group in November 2019 to release the single "That Bitch".

In October 2020, after the unexpected success of "Feel Something", Miller would return to releasing under Hollywood Records with the single "Wisdom Teeth". The song was released as the lead single to Miller's EP titled, Elated!, which was released on October 23 of that same year.

Career

2012: The X Factor (US) 
Miller was a contestant on season two of The X Factor, finishing in ninth place. She was eliminated after losing the final showdown to CeCe Frey. However, Miller received more votes than Frey meaning if the result went to deadlock, Miller would have been saved. She performed the following songs on the show:

2013–2015: Record deal and Not an Apology 
On April 11, 2013, it was officially announced that she was signed to Syco Music and Hollywood Records, marking the first collaborative arrangement between these two labels. Shortly after the ending of the second season of The X Factor, Miller changed her name to simply Bea Miller. She contributed her voice towards the audio book for Jennifer Donnelly's new book, Deep Blue: Songspell and a promotional song for it called "Open Your Eyes" in 2014. She uploaded her new song "Rich Kids" to YouTube in 2014, and it was included in her 2015 album Not an Apology. She released a clip of a new song called "Enemy Fire".

"Enemy Fire" premiered on her own Vevo channel in April 2014. She worked with busbee, Jarrad Rogers, Mike Del Rio, and other noteworthy producers for her album. Her debut EP Young Blood was released on April 22, 2014, with the lead single "Young Blood". Her EP peaked at No. 2 on the iTunes pop albums chart. Her EP had a debut peak on Billboard 200 at No. 64. Miller opened up for Demi Lovato on select cities for her Demi World Tour.

In December 2014, she was picked as Elvis Duran's Artist of the Month and was featured on NBC's Today show hosted by Kathy Lee Gifford and Hoda Kotb, where she performed live her single "Young Blood".

In 2015, Miller was named Radio Disney's newest Next Big Thing artist. She appeared on Disney Channel many times with it and promoted her album with it as well. Her debut single "Young Blood" won the 2015 Radio Disney Music Awards for "Best Song to Rock Out to With Your BFF".

Miller released her debut album, Not an Apology, on July 24, 2015, on Hollywood Records. The album peaked at No. 7 on the Billboard 200. On April 24, 2015, it was announced that Miller would accompany Debby Ryan and Natalie La Rose as opening acts for the summer leg of Fifth Harmony's The Reflection Tour, which began on July 15 in Louisville, Kentucky. Miller finished the tour in late August. In July 2015, she was chosen by public vote to be the next Vevo Lift artist.

2016–2018: Aurora 
On April 20, 2016, it was announced that Miller would join Selena Gomez on her Revival Tour as an opening act along with DNCE. The tour ran from May throughout the summer. Miller also announced that she would be hosting meet and greets titled "Tea With Bea".

Miller released a non-album single "Yes Girl" on May 20, 2016. She performed the song and a song that was unreleased at the moment, titled "Song Like You" numerous times on the Revival Tour. Her song "This Little Light of Mine" was featured in a 2016 advertising campaign for 3 Musketeers. On February 24, 2017, she released the first part of a three-EP project, Chapter One: Blue. On March 30, 2017, she performed "Song Like You" on The Late Late Show with James Corden. It was her first late-night talk show appearance. On June 2, 2017, she released the second part of her three-EP project, Chapter Two: Red. The final EP, Chapter Three: Yellow was released on October 6, 2017.

In August 2017, Miller's song "Brand New Eyes" was featured in the trailer to the film Wonder, directed by Stephen Chbosky and starring Julia Roberts and Owen Wilson.

Miller's second full-length album and debut international album Aurora was released on February 23, 2018. It includes all the songs from the three previous extended plays (dubbed as "chapters"), along with five new tracks. Miller had a hand in writing all but one of the songs on Aurora, on topics about "everything from existential boredom to slut shaming". She performed "S.L.U.T.", the album's lead single, on MTV's TRL on February 12, 2018. She conceived of the song as a way to reclaim the word's negative connotations as the positive acronym "sweet little unforgettable thing".

She was featured on vocals on the 2018 NOTD single "I Wanna Know", released in March 2018. The song went Gold in the US and is Platinum in several countries, including Australia, Canada, the United Kingdom and Sweden. She performed the song live on Today in June 2018. She also promoted the single at multiple shows and acoustic sets.

2019–present: Touring and Elated! 
In February 2019, Miller announced her first headlining tour titled "Nice To Meet U Tour". On March 1, she released the lead single off her upcoming third studio album, titled "It's Not U It's Me", which is a collaboration with American R&B singer  6lack. Following this, she released the single "Feel Something" and announced her "Sunsets in Outerspace Tour". In August 2019, Bea Miller released the single "Feels Like Home" with Canadian singer-songwriter Jessie Reyez. A collaboration with production team Snakehips titled, "Never Gonna Like You", was released in September 2019.

Miller released the single "That Bitch" in November 2019, independently from her record label. She portrayed League of Legends character Evelynn in the virtual musical group K/DA for "The Baddest" a single from K/DA's EP All Out. In September 2020, Bea Miller would release a series of compilation EPs which consisted of; Quarantine on September 4, Sad Boy Hours on September 18 and Lust on September 24.

On October 7, 2020, Bea Miller announced the release of the single "Wisdom Teeth" which would be released on October 9 and serve as the lead single to Miller's EP Elated!, which was released on October 23, 2020. On November 6, 2021, Miller's single "Playground" was featured in the first act of the League of Legends animated series Arcane; this single was released the same day. The single's music video was part of the opening ceremony for the 2021 League of Legends World Championship.

On January 13, 2023, Miller's single "Lonely Bitch" was released on her own record label, Gauche Records. The record label was created by Miller in partnership with ADA, a music distribution company owned by Warner Music Group.

Personal life 
Miller is the daughter of two mothers, and has two adopted younger siblings. She is from Maplewood, New Jersey. As a preteen, Miller attended the family camp COLAGE in Provincetown, Massachusetts. Miller experiences synesthesia, which means she sees different colors when hearing certain sounds.

In 2015, Miller began dating American singer Jacob Whitesides. The couple broke up in May 2016, after one year of dating.

Miller is an ambassador for the anti-bullying charity Ditch the Label.

Discography

Albums

Extended plays

Singles

As lead artist

As featured artist

Promotional singles

Guest appearances

Music videos

Filmography

Awards and nominations

Tours 
Headlining act
Nice to Meet U Tour (2019)
Sunsets in Outerspace Tour (2019)

 Opening act 
 Demi Lovato – Demi World Tour (2014)
 Fifth Harmony – The Reflection Tour (2015)
 Selena Gomez – Revival Tour (2016)
 Coldplay – Music of the Spheres World Tour (2022)

Supporting act

Firefly Festivals
Lollapalooza
Voodoo Music Fest

Notes

References

External links 

1999 births
Living people
21st-century American actresses
21st-century American women singers
Actresses from New Jersey
American child actresses
American child singers
American women pop singers
American pop rock singers
American women guitarists
American film actresses
American television actresses
American voice actresses
People from Maplewood, New Jersey
Singers from New Jersey
The X Factor (American TV series) contestants
Hollywood Records artists
Guitarists from New Jersey
21st-century American singers